Sarıdayı is a village in the Pazaryeri District, Bilecik Province, Turkey. Its population is 190 (2021).

References

Villages in Pazaryeri District